Leo Bernard Skladany (August 9, 1927 – March 18, 2003) was an American football defensive end in the National Football League (NFL) for the Philadelphia Eagles and the New York Giants. He had a blocked punt return touchdown in the 1949 NFL Championship Game In his career, Skladany played in seven regular season games and two playoff games. He played college football at the University of Pittsburgh. His nephew was punter Tom Skladany and his brother was College football Hall of Famer Joe Skladany.

References

External links

1927 births
2003 deaths
People from Larksville, Pennsylvania
American people of Slovak descent
American football defensive ends
Players of American football from Pennsylvania
Pittsburgh Panthers football players
Philadelphia Eagles players
New York Giants players